Təzə Şilyan (also, Taza-Shil’yan) is a village and municipality in the Ujar Rayon of Azerbaijan.  It has a population of 2,734.

References 

Populated places in Ujar District